Stephen Stirling may refer to:

Stephen Stirling (musician), British classical French horn player
Stephen Stirling (footballer) (born 1990), Scottish football player
Steve Stirling (born 1949), ice hockey coach
S. M. Stirling (born 1953), writer